Oriental Research Institute may refer to:
 Oriental Research Institute Mysore, India
 Bhandarkar Oriental Research Institute, Pune, India
Oriental Research Institute & Manuscripts Library, Kerala, India
Rajasthan Oriental Research Institute, India